The 2009 Russian Super Cup was the 7th Russian Super Cup match, a football match which was contested between the 2008 Russian Premier League champion, Rubin Kazan, and the winner of 2007–08 Russian Cup, CSKA Moscow. The match was held on 7 March 2009 at the Luzhniki Stadium in Moscow, Russia. CSKA Moscow beat Rubin Kazan 2–1 in extra time, after the normal time had finished in a 1–1 draw, to win their fourth Russian Super Cup.

Match details

See also
2009 in Russian football
2008 Russian Premier League
2007–08 Russian Cup

External links
 Official stats

Super Cup
Russian Super Cup
Russian Super Cup 2009
Russian Super Cup 2009
March 2009 sports events in Europe
2009 in Moscow
Sports competitions in Moscow